Struer station ( or Struer Banegård) is a railway station serving the town of Struer in Jutland, Denmark.

Struer station is an important railway junction where the Langå-Struer Line, the Esbjerg-Struer Line and the Thy Line from Struer to Thisted meet. The station was opened in 1865 with the opening of the Skive-Struer section of the Langå-Struer Line. It offers direct InterCityLyn services to Copenhagen as well as regional train services to Aarhus, Fredericia, Skjern and Thisted. The train services are operated by Arriva and DSB.

History 
The station was opened on 17 November 1865 with the opening of the third and last section of the Langå-Struer Line from Skive to Struer.

See also 
 List of railway stations in Denmark

References

Citations

Bibliography

External links

 Banedanmark – government agency responsible for maintenance and traffic control of most of the Danish railway network
 DSB – largest Danish train operating company
 Arriva – British multinational public transport company operating bus and train services in Denmark
 Danske Jernbaner – website with information on railway history in Denmark

Railway stations opened in 1865
Railway stations in the Central Denmark Region
Railway stations in Denmark opened in the 19th century